Nerea Eizagirre Lasa (born 4 January 2000) is a Spanish professional footballer who plays as a midfielder for Liga F club Real Sociedad and the Spain women's national team.

Career
Eizagirre was playing for Añorga prior to joining Real Sociedad. Following some goals scored for her club, Eizagirre earned a call up to the Spain senior national team. She made her debut for the team on 23 October 2020 against Czech Republic, coming on as a substitute for Esther González.

International goals

References

External links
Profile at BDFutbol
Profile at Real Sociedad

2000 births
Living people
Women's association football midfielders
Spanish women's footballers
Spain women's international footballers
Footballers from the Basque Country (autonomous community)
Real Sociedad (women) players
Añorga KKE players
People from Tolosa, Spain
Sportspeople from Gipuzkoa
Spain women's youth international footballers
21st-century Spanish women